is the ninth single of the Morning Musume subgroup Minimoni. It was released on May 14, 2003 and sold 29,088 copies, reaching number nine on the Oricon Charts.

Track listing 
All songs written and composed by Tsunku.

Members at the time of single

External links 
 Minimoni Kazoe Uta (Ofuro Version)/Minimoni Kazoe Uta (Date Version) entry on the Hello! Project official website

Zetima Records singles
Minimoni songs
2003 singles
Songs written by Tsunku
Song recordings produced by Tsunku
Japanese-language songs